There Is a Breeze is the debut album by singer-guitarist Michael Johnson.  It was first released in August 1973 on Atco Records, re-released on Sanskrit Records (a record label owned by Johnson and his manager, Keith Christianson) in 1976, and released on EMI America in 1981.

It was co-produced by Phil Ramone, Peter Yarrow, Chris Dedrick and Michael Johnson; and featured Leo Kottke on guitar, Gerry Niewood on saxophone and Ralph Towner on guitar.

Track listing
Side 1:
 "Pilot Me" (Greg Brown) – 3:14
 "In Your Eyes" (Amy Johnson) – 2:47
 "There Is a Breeze"  (Mark Henley) – 3:39
 "See You Soon"  (Paul Johnson) – 2:24
 "Old Folks" (Jacques Brel, Gerard Jouannest, Jean Cori, Eric Blau, Mort Shuman) – 5:12
 "Rooty Toot Toot for the Moon" (Greg Brown) – 4:41

Side 2:
 "My Opening Farewell" (Jackson Browne) – 4:36
 "I Got You Covered" (Biff Rose; prologue & epilogue by Michael Johnson)  – 3:38
 "On the Road" (Carl Franzen)  – 3:17
 "Study in E Minor" (H. Villa Lobos) – 4:33
 "Happier Days" (Michael Johnson) – 2:19
 "You've Got to Be Carefully Taught" (Richard Rodgers, Oscar Hammerstein) – 1:16

Personnel
Michael Johnson - first guitar, vocals
Chris Dedrick - flugelhorn, pump organ, recorder, bass, backing vocals
Phillip Markowitz - piano
Ted Moore - drums
Leo Kottke - bottleneck guitar
Gary Gauger - drums, percussion
George Ricci - cello
Margaret Ross - harp
Gerry Niewood - saxophone
Ralph Towner - second guitar, 12-string guitar
Ron Zito - drums
Airto - percussion

Singles
"On the Road" (Atco Records, Atco 6895)
"Rooty Toot Toot for the Moon" (Atco Records, Atco 6942)

1973 debut albums
Michael Johnson (singer) albums
Albums produced by Phil Ramone
Atco Records albums